Anguksa, Haanguksa or Lower Anguk Temple is a temple located in Pohang, Gyeongsangbuk-do, South Korea.

References 

Buddhist temples in South Korea
Pohang
Buildings and structures in North Gyeongsang Province
Taego Buddhist temples